Season twenty-five of the television program American Experience originally aired on the PBS network in the United States on January 8, 2013 and concluded on November 12, 2013. The show celebrated its 25th anniversary. The season contained eight new episodes and began with the first part of The Abolitionists film, "From Courage to Freedom".

Episodes

References

2013 American television seasons
American Experience